Abdul Wahab is a Bangladesh Awami League politician and the former Member of Parliament of Chittagong-5.

Career
Wahab was elected to parliament from Chittagong-5 as a Bangladesh Awami League candidate in 1973.

Death
Wahab died on 29 October 2011.

References

Awami League politicians
1st Jatiya Sangsad members
Year of birth missing
2011 deaths